The Warner Hutton House is a historic house in Saratoga, California. It was built in 1896 for Warner Hutton. Hutton was born in New York, and he inherited landholdings from his father, a fruit farmer. The house was acquired by the city of Saratoga in 1987.

The house was designed in the Queen Anne architectural style. It has been listed on the National Register of Historic Places since March 17, 2006.

References

Houses on the National Register of Historic Places in California
National Register of Historic Places in Santa Clara County, California
Queen Anne architecture in California
Houses completed in 1896